Siwakorn Sangwong (born February 6, 1997) is a Thai professional footballer who plays as a defensive midfielder for Thai League 2 club Rayong.

Honours

Club
BG Pathum United
 Thai League 2 (1) : 2019

References

External links
 

Living people
1997 births
Siwakorn Sangwong
Siwakorn Sangwong
Association football midfielders
Siwakorn Sangwong
Siwakorn Sangwong
Siwakorn Sangwong